Oliver Pusztai (born 14 October 1981, in Szombathely) is a Hungarian football player.

Club career

Hungary
Pusztai started his professional career at age 18 at his hometown club Szombathelyi Haladás in 1999. After a short break in the Hungarian 2nd division (NB2) with Büki TK and as a member of the Hungary national under-21 football team, he made a move in 2002 to BFC Siófok and played again in the highest league of Hungary (NB1). In 2003 Pusztai get a contract from the ruling champion MTK Budapest and goes in the Hungarian capital city. In the same year he played in the UEFA Champions League qualification against HJK Helsinki and Celtic Glasgow and later in UEFA Cup against Dinamo Zagreb.

In 2004 Pusztai moved to Győri ETO FC and played there 2 seasons. Than till 2008 he was player and an important member of a small-budget club, Rákospalotai EAC in Budapest and successfully escaped twice the relegation.

U-21 national team (Hungary)
He was coming player between 2001-2003 of the Hungarian U-21 team and played for the qualification to the UEFA European Under-21 Championship in Germany and to the 2004 Summer Olympics in Athens.

Austria
In 2008, after 100 NB1 games in Hungary, Pusztai went international and played 2 years in the Austrian Football Bundesliga at SK Austria Kärnten in Klagenfurt. From 2010 he played 4 seasons in the 3rd division (Regionalliga Mitte) in the same city at SK Austria Klagenfurt (2007).

Since 2014 Pusztai is at a traditional club named ASV Klagenfurt. And played there the season 2015/2016, first time in club history - after the winning of Austrian Landesliga - in the Austrian Regional League again.
In 2019 went Pusztai to SV St.Jakob/Rosental in the Austrian Landesliga and starts his 20th Season!

External links
HLSZ

official website Oliver Pusztai #14

1981 births
Living people
Hungarian footballers
Hungarian expatriate footballers
Association football defenders
Austrian Regionalliga players
SK Austria Klagenfurt players
Győri ETO FC players
SK Austria Kärnten players
Szombathelyi Haladás footballers
BFC Siófok players
MTK Budapest FC players
Rákospalotai EAC footballers
Sportspeople from Szombathely